CD79b molecule, immunoglobulin-associated beta, also known as CD79B (Cluster of Differentiation 79B), is a human gene.

It is associated with agammaglobulinemia-6.

The B lymphocyte antigen receptor is a multimeric complex that includes the antigen-specific component, surface immunoglobulin (Ig). Surface Ig non-covalently associates with two other proteins, Ig-alpha and Ig-beta, which are necessary for expression and function of the B-cell antigen receptor. This gene encodes the Ig-beta protein of the B-cell antigen component. Alternatively spliced transcript variants encoding different isoforms have been described.

See also
 Cluster of differentiation

References

Further reading

External links
 
 
 PDBe-KB provides an overview of all the structure information available in the PDB for Human B-cell antigen receptor complex-associated protein beta chain (CD79B)

Clusters of differentiation